Alsodes montanus is a species of frog in the family Alsodidae found in Chile and possibly Argentina.
Its natural habitats are temperate shrubland and rivers.
It is threatened by habitat loss.

References 

montanus
Amphibians of Chile
Amphibians of the Andes
Endemic fauna of Chile
Taxonomy articles created by Polbot
Amphibians described in 1902